W. Blackwell (full name and dates of birth and death unknown) was an English cricketer.  Blackwell's batting style is assumed to be left-handed.

Blackwell made a single first-class appearance for the Left-Handed team in the Left-Handed v Right-Handed fixture of 1835 at Lord's Cricket Ground. In a match which the Right-Handed won by an innings and 87 runs, Blackwell was twice dismissed for a duck, firstly by Sam Redgate and secondly by James Cobbett.

References

External links
W. Blackwell at ESPNcricinfo
W. Blackwell at CricketArchive

English cricketers
Left-Handed v Right-Handed cricketers